This is a list of films which placed number-one at the weekend box office in Australia during 1998. Amounts are in Australian dollars. 

(N.B.: Seemingly improper dates are due to holiday weekends or other occasions. N/A denotes information that is not available from Urban Cinefile nor Movie Marshal.)

Highest-grossing films

Highest-grossing films of 1998 by calendar gross:

References

See also
 List of Australian films – Australian films by year

1998
Australia
1998 in Australian cinema